Zagorica pri Dobrniču is a small settlement in the Municipality of Trebnje in eastern Slovenia. It lies south of Dobrnič below the eastern slopes of Mount Lisec.  The area is part of the historical region of Lower Carniola. The municipality is now included in the Southeast Slovenia Statistical Region.

Name
The name of the settlement was changed from Zagorica to Zagorica pri Dobrniču in 1953.

References

External links
Zagorica pri Dobrniču at Geopedia

Populated places in the Municipality of Trebnje